Little Switzerland is a ski resort in Slinger, Wisconsin.

History 
Little Switzerland opened on December 7, 1941, with its last day of operation under its original owners on March 10, 2007. The area was completely remodeled in the summer of 2012 and reopened with new owners in the fall of 2012 as a year-round restaurant and winter ski area. Skiing and snowboarding resumed in the winter of 2012–2013.

Description 
The ski hill has 18 runs, 4 chairlifts, 1 handle tow, 1 surface lift, and 2 rope tows covering both sides of the hill. Three terrain parks and a chalet are at the bottom of the hill, along with a full-service restaurant, bar, game room, snack bar and pro shop.

There are six runs, including a beginner terrain park, on the front side of the hill, and eleven runs on the back side.

Little Switzerland also opens lifts during warm months for downhill mountain biking. They have green to black trails along with rentals. 

They also host Gravityfest each year. See the website for more details.

See also
List of ski areas and resorts in the United States

Notes

External links
 

Tourist attractions in Washington County, Wisconsin
Buildings and structures in Washington County, Wisconsin
Ski areas and resorts in Wisconsin
Sports in the Milwaukee metropolitan area